The 1990–91 Washington State Cougars men's basketball team represented Washington State University for the 1990–91 NCAA Division I men's basketball season. Led by fourth-year head coach Kelvin Sampson, the Cougars were members of the Pacific-10 Conference and played their home games on campus at Beasley Coliseum in Pullman, Washington.

There was no conference tournament this season; last played in 1990, it resumed in 2002.

References

External links
Sports Reference – Washington State Cougars: 1990–91 basketball season

Washington State Cougars men's basketball seasons
Washington State Cougars
Washington State
Washington State